The Gumshoe Awards are an American award for popular crime fiction literary works. The Gumshoe Awards are awarded annually by the American Internet magazine Mystery Ink (not to be confused with Mystery Inc.) to recognize the best achievements in crime fiction. The nominated books were chosen from those published for the first time in the United States in English (or English translation). They have been awarded since 2002 in several categories:
Best Mystery
Best Thriller
Best First Novel
Best Crime Fiction Website
Lifetime Achievement Award

In 2005 a new award category was introduced: Best European Crime Novel.

Categories

Prize winners by category

Best Mystery (2002/3: "Best Novel")

Best Thriller

Best European Crime Novel 
Not awarded: 2008

Best First Novel

Lifetime Achievement

Best Crime Fiction Website (2002/3: "Best Author Website")

See also 
 List of crime writers

References

Mystery and detective fiction awards
American literary awards
Awards established in 2002
Lifetime achievement awards
2002 establishments in the United States